Jigsaw is a 1949 American film noir crime drama directed by Fletcher Markle starring Franchot Tone, Jean Wallace and Marc Lawrence.  The feature was  produced by the Danziger Brothers, Edward J. Danziger and Harry Lee Danziger, from a screenplay by Vincent McConnor and Fletcher Markle, based on a story by John Roeburt.

Of note is that the film has cameo appearances by Marlene Dietrich, Henry Fonda, John Garfield, Burgess Meredith, Marsha Hunt, Doe Avedon, Everett Sloane, newspaper columnist Leonard Lyons, and the director Fletcher Markle.

Plot
The title refers to a jigsaw puzzle and the story begins with the murder of a print shop owner that is quickly labeled a suicide. But newspaper columnist Charlie Riggs is convinced that it was a murder related to a white neo-fascist organization called the Crusaders and imparts this suspicion to Assistant District Attorney Howard Malloy. He also publishes this opinion in his column. Then Riggs himself is murdered, inducing Malloy to launch an investigation into the Crusaders. Because the group appears to be getting backing from organized crime, Malloy looks there, soon receiving unsolicited help from a crime boss called Angel, who recommends him for the position of special prosecutor.

Later, with further help from a prominent judge's widow, Malloy is appointed. This is supposed to put him in the pocket of those behind the murders. But Malloy proceeds to investigate the artist who created the Crusaders recruiting poster. Seeing in the artist's studio a painting of an attractive night club singer, Malloy then proceeds to investigate her. This leads to a series of revelations regarding all of these characters and ends with more people dead and wounded in a fiery exchange at the end.

Cast

 Franchot Tone as Howard Malloy
 Jean Wallace as Barbara Whitfield
 Myron McCormick as Charles Riggs
 Marc Lawrence as Angelo Agostini
 Winifred Lenihan as Mrs. Hartley
 Doe Avedon as Caroline Riggs
 Hedley Rainnie as Sigmund Kosterich
 Walter Vaughan as District Attorney Walker
 George Breen as Knuckles
 Robert Gist as Tommy Quigley

 Hester Sondergaard as Mrs. Borg
 Luella Gear as Pet Shop Owner
 Henry Fonda as Nightclub Waiter
 Alexander Campbell as Pemberton
 Robert Noe as Waldron
 Alexander Lockwood as Nichols
 Ken Smith as Wylie
 Alan MacAteer as Museum Guard
 Manuel Aparicio as Warehouse Guard
 Brainerd Duffield as Butler

Reception

Critical response
When the film was released, The New York Times film critic, Bosley Crowther, panned the film, writing, "On the sole account of Jigsaw, which opened at the Mayfair on Saturday, Hollywood has no reason to look immediately and anxiously to its laurels ... It is sluggishly directed by Fletcher Markle, who also co-authored the script, and almost indifferently played, where good playing would do the most for it, by Franchot Tone in the principal role ... An irresistible temptation to get a few recognizable stars to play bit roles in the picture was accepted unfortunately. John Garfield is seen as a loafer, Henry Fonda as a waiter in a club, Burgess Meredith as a bartender, Marcia Hunt as a secretary and such. This tomfooling doesn't help the picture. It gives the whole thing a faintly prankish look."

References

External links

 
 
 
 
 Jigsaw informational site and DVD review at DVD Beaver (includes images)
 

1949 films
1949 crime drama films
American black-and-white films
Film noir
United Artists films
American crime drama films
1949 directorial debut films
1940s English-language films
Films directed by Fletcher Markle
1940s American films